Kinesin-like protein KIF17 is a protein that in humans is encoded by the KIF17 gene. KIF17 and its close relative, C. elegans OSM-3, are members of the kinesin-2 family of plus-end directed microtubule-based motor proteins. In contrast to heterotrimeric kinesin-2 motors, however, KIF17 and OSM-3 form distinct homodimeric complexes. Homodimeric kinesin-2 has been implicated in the transport of NMDA receptors along dendrites for delivery to the dendritic membrane, whereas both heterotrimeric and homodimeric kinesin-2 motors function cooperatively in anterograde intraflagellar transport (IFT) and cilium biogenesis.

References

Further reading